Aloísio Roque Opperman (June 19, 1936 – April 26, 2014) was a Roman Catholic bishop.

Ordained to the priesthood in 1961, he was named bishop of the Diocese of Ituitaba, Brazil, in 1983 and then coadjutor bishop of Campanha in 1988 succeeding as diocesan bishop in 1991. In 1996, Oppermann was named Archbishop of Uberaba and retired in 2012.

Notes

1936 births
2014 deaths
21st-century Roman Catholic archbishops in Brazil
20th-century Roman Catholic archbishops in Brazil
Roman Catholic archbishops of Uberaba
Roman Catholic bishops of Campanha
Roman Catholic bishops of Ituiutaba